The Washington Square Transit Center is a TriMet transit center located at the Washington Square shopping center in Tigard, Oregon, in the mall's parking lot north of J. C. Penney.
 
The following bus routes serve the transit center:
 43 – Taylors Ferry Road
 45 – Garden Home
 56 – Scholls Ferry Road
 62 – Murray Blvd.
 76 – Beaverton/Tualatin
 78 – Beaverton/Lake Oswego

See also
 List of TriMet transit centers

References

External links
Washington Square Transit Center on TriMet website

1994 establishments in Oregon
Tigard, Oregon
Transportation buildings and structures in Washington County, Oregon
TriMet transit centers